Filip Walotka (born 17 February 1980) is a Polish sprinter. He competed in the men's 4 × 400 metres relay at the 2000 Summer Olympics.

References

1980 births
Living people
Athletes (track and field) at the 2000 Summer Olympics
Polish male sprinters
Olympic athletes of Poland
Goodwill Games medalists in athletics
Place of birth missing (living people)
Skra Warszawa athletes
Competitors at the 2001 Goodwill Games
21st-century Polish people